Moshniahy is a village in Odesa Oblast of southern Ukraine located near the Dniester river border with Moldova. The town is located at 47° 56' 53" North, 29° 30' 26" East.

References

Villages in Podilsk Raion
Baltsky Uyezd
Shtetls
Balta Hromada